Sri Lankan Sign Language is a visual language used by deaf people in Sri Lanka and has regional variations stemming from the 25 Deaf schools in Sri Lanka.

Classification
Wittmann (1991) posits that the Sri Lankan languages, as a group, are a language isolate ('prototype' sign language), though one developed through stimulus diffusion from an existing sign language. It is not known if they are related to each other, nor how many there are.

References

External links
Sri Lankan sign language

Sign language isolates
Languages of Sri Lanka
Deaf culture in Sri Lanka